The 1936–37 Scottish Districts season is a record of all the rugby union matches for Scotland's district teams.

History

Glasgow District beat Edinburgh District in the Inter-City match.

Results

Inter-City

Glasgow District:

Edinburgh District:

Other Scottish matches

North of Scotland District: 

South of Scotland District:

Trial matches

Scotland Probables:

Scottish Possibles:

English matches

No other District matches played.

International matches

No touring matches this season.

References

1936–37 in Scottish rugby union
Scottish Districts seasons